Golestan (also romanized as Golestān) is a city in, and the capital of, Golestan District of Baharestan County, Tehran province, Iran. At the 2006 census, its population was 231,882 in 57,216 households, when it was in Robat Karim County. The following census in 2011 counted 259,480 people in 72,096 households, by which time the district, together with Bostan District, had been separated from the county and Baharestan County established. The latest census in 2016 showed a population of 239,556 people in 70,072 households.

Climate
Köppen-Geiger climate classification system classifies its climate as cold semi-arid (BSk). In summer, its average temperatures are cooler than that of Tehran city, so as its average winter temperatures are colder.

References 

Baharestan County

Cities in Tehran Province

Populated places in Tehran Province

Populated places in Baharestan County